Gregory Fernando Pappas is a professor of philosophy at Texas A&M University.  He is currently a National Humanities Center Fellow (for 2021-2022)  And was senior fellow at Maria Sibylla Merian International Centre for Advanced Studies in the Humanities and Social Sciences Conviviality-Inequality in Latin America.  Pappas works within the American Pragmatist and Latin American traditions in ethics and social-political philosophy.  He is the author of numerous articles on the philosophy of William James, John Dewey, and Luis Villoro.

In 2018 Pappas was distinguished research fellow for the Latino Research Initiative at The University of Texas at Austin. He is the author of John Dewey’s Ethics: Democracy as Experience and Pragmatism in the Americas.  He is the editor-in-chief of The Inter-American Journal of Philosophy, which is the first online journal devoted to inter-American philosophy with an inter-American editorial board that includes prominent philosophers from the Americas.  He was a Fulbright scholar for the 2012–2013 academic year in Argentina and president of the Society for the Advancement of American Philosophy.

Pappas has been the recipient of a Ford Foundation Postdoctoral Fellowship, the William James and the Latin American Thought prizes by the American Philosophical Association, and the Mellow Prize by the Society for the Advancement of American Philosophy.

Books
 John Dewey’s Ethics: Democracy as Experience
 Pragmatism in the Americas

References

External links
 Personal Website
 Gregory Fernando Pappas, PhilPeople

21st-century American philosophers
Political philosophers
Philosophy academics
Living people
1960 births
Philosophy journal editors
Texas A&M University faculty
University of Texas at Austin alumni
University of Puerto Rico alumni
University of Wyoming alumni
Pragmatists
University of Texas at Austin faculty